The Hyundai RB (hangul:현대 알비, 현대RB) is a series of rear engine coaches manufactured by the South Korean Hyundai Motor Company.

Most models of the coach are distinguishable by a rear engine, at coach model is commonly referred to as "RB" or Rear engine Bus, but the common Hyundai badge is usually used on the rear.

In Japan, Asia-Pacific, Mid-East, Africa, South America, its principal competitors are Asia AM, Daewoo BV.

Model concept
The RB family of bus and coach chassis was evolved from designs made by Hyundai's Thames commercial vehicle subsidiary until 1978. The engine was mounted at the rear of the vehicle, and a passenger entrance was provided ahead of the front axle, opposite to the driver. The original RB520 and RB585 models later became the RB520 and RB585 automatics, and with constant revision and upgrading, they gave way to the RB600 by 1986. In an attempt to lower the floor height of the vehicle, the supercharged diesel engine was tilted over to one side around 1978.

In South Korea, the RB was popular during the 1980s, when considerable financial assistance was available to operators for fleet renewal. However, following the election of the Grand National Party Government in 1986, the Stock Exchange money began to dry up causing demand for buses to decline. This led Hyundai to build the next-generation Aero City bus around 1991.

Now only a small number of RB buses remain in passenger use, but many have gone on to second lives as mobile tour buses and stock car transporters.

Models
RB 520: City Bus of urban & suburban bus
RB 585: Tour Bus of private & commercial bus
RB 600: Tour Bus of private & commercial bus
RB 635: Express Bus

Coaches (bus)
Rear-wheel-drive vehicles
Cab over vehicles

Hyundai buses